Johan Magnus Lönnroth  (born 25 December 1937, Gothenburg), is a Swedish left-wing politician and an economist. He has also been a Member of parliament for Vänsterpartiet (the Swedish Left Party) for several years. 1991–2003. He is currently working part-time at University of Gothenburg.

Bibliography

Swedish 
Marxism som matematisk ekonomi: en kritik av några moderna Marxtolkningar, 1977
Minervas uggla: om ekonomerna som maktens predikanter, 1985
Politisk ekonomi: svenska och internationella tanketraditioner, 1989
Ekonomi för alla, 1991
Schamanerna: om ekonomi som förgylld vardag, 1993
Den tredje vänstern, 1997
Gunnar Westin Silverstolpe: folkbildare, poet och naivistisk nationalekonom, 2003
Göteborgsskolan: praktisk, friakademisk, historisk, folkbildande, social, 2006
Den tredje vänstern (new revised edition), 2009
Hallonöarna, 2010
Albin Ström och det frihetliga spåret i svensk arbetarrörelse, 2014

References

1937 births
Living people
Members of the Riksdag 1991–1994
Members of the Riksdag 1994–1998
Members of the Riksdag 1998–2002
Members of the Riksdag 2002–2006
Members of the Riksdag from the Left Party (Sweden)
People from Gothenburg